WFBG (1290 AM) is a news/talk radio station broadcasting in Altoona, Pennsylvania.  WFBG originally broadcast on the frequency of 1310 kilohertz and was known as "The Voice of the Alleghenies." It signed on in 1924, at 100 watts. Its call letters stood for the name of the station's founder, William F. B. Gable, owner of Gable's department store in Altoona. It moved to 1290 on the dial, and broadcast at 5000 watts daytime, 1000 watts at night. It was a very influential and top rated station, the biggest station between Philadelphia and Pittsburgh. In the 1960s, the Morning Mayor, as he was called, was Big John Riley, working from 6 to 10am. Dick Richards followed from 10a to 3p. Dan Resh did the 3p to 7p shift and Dick DiAndrea owned the night from 7p to midnight. DiAndrea also hosted a very popular Bandstand program on WFBG-TV. Weekends on radio were handled by Bill Bukowski (8a to 4p) and Bob Witten (4p to midnight). The format was top 40 hits. The news team included Del Smith, Charles Ritchey, and Bob Witten. The station was purchased by Triangle Publications under Walter Annenberg in Philadelphia. General Manager was John Stilli, Program Director; Jim VanDeVelde; News Director, Lantz Hoffman. It was grouped with WFBG-FM, and TV Channel 10. TV 10 was affiliated with CBS and ABC. All three stations were located on 6th Avenue in Altoona, Pennsylvania.

It was announced on October 12, 2022 that Forever Media is selling 34 stations, including WFBG and the entire Altoona cluster, to State College-based Seven Mountains Media for $17.3 million. The deal closed on January 2, 2023.

References

External links
WFBG Facebook

 Official Website

News and talk radio stations in the United States
FBG